The 1983–84 season was FC Dinamo București's 35th season in Divizia A. In this season, Dinamo made their best ever performance at the European level, reaching the semi-finals of the European Cup.

Dinamo's opponents in the first round were Finnish champions Kuusysi. Dinamo Bucharest won the first leg 1–0 away and the second leg 3–0 at home, thus winning the round 4–0 on aggregate.
The Romanians' opponents in the second round were reigning European champions Hamburg. The first leg, which was played in Bucharest, was won by Dinamo 3–0. The second leg was played at Hamburg's home ground Volksparkstadion; Hamburg won the match 3–2, ("Dinamo ruined their [Hamburg's] evening with two goals in the last five minutes to send the holders crashing out at the first hurdle") 
which meant that Dinamo took the tie 5–3 on aggregate. Dinamo Bucharest's opponents in the quarter-finals were Soviet champions Dinamo Minsk. The first leg, played in Minsk, ended in a 1–1 draw. The second leg, played in Bucharest, was a close contest, but Dinamo Bucharest won 1–0 to take the tie 2–1 on aggregate.

The semi-final between Liverpool and Dinamo Bucharest was held over two legs in Liverpool and Bucharest, on 11 April 1984 and 25 April 1984, respectively. It was the first meeting between the two clubs. Liverpool won the first leg by the narrow margin of 1–0 after midfielder Sammy Lee scored. Dinamo nearly scored a late equaliser when a shot by Ionel Augustin beat Bruce Grobbelaar only to hit the post. The physical and aggressive nature of the Anfield encounter reached a peak in the seventieth minute, when the Liverpool midfield player and captain Graeme Souness knocked out in an off the ball incident his Dinamo counterpart Lică Movilă, breaking the Romanian's jaw in two places.

Liverpool secured a great advantage early on in the return leg when striker Ian Rush scored an away goal in the eleventh minute, leaving the Romanian champions needing three goals to win the tie thanks to the away goals rule. Dinamo striker Costel Orac scored in the thirty-ninth minute, but the tie was effectively killed off in the eighty-fourth minute when Rush scored a second goal.

At the beginning of the season, Cornel Dinu retired from the footballer career after 17 years spent only with Dinamo Bucharest. At that time, Dinu had two records for the Romanian football, the most capped player in the Romania national football team, with 75 matches, and the most capped player in Divizia A, with 454 matches. In this season, Dinu was the assistant manager for Nicolae-Nicuşor.

Results

Romanian Cup final

European Cup 

First round

Dinamo București won 4-0 on aggregate

Second round

Dinamo București won 5-3 on aggregate

Quarterfinals

Dinamo București won 2-1 on aggregate

Semifinals

Liverpool F.C. won 3-1 on aggregate

Squad 

Goalkeepers: Dumitru Moraru (31 / 0); Constantin Eftimescu (4 / 0); Ovidiu Barba (1 / 0).
Defenders: Mircea Rednic (31 / 0); Marin Ion (28 / 0); Alexandru Nicolae (30 / 0); Ioan Andone (24 / 1); Nelu Stănescu (26 / 2); Ioan Mărginean (19 / 1); Liviu Baicea (1 / 0).
Midfielders:  Gheorghe Mulțescu (23 / 8); Ionel Augustin (31 / 17); Marin Dragnea (29 / 15); Alexandru Custov (28 / 2); Lică Movilă (19 / 1); Viorel Radu (9 / 1); Grațian Moldovan (8 / 0).
Forwards: Cornel Țălnar (30 / 1); Iulius Nemțeanu (7 / 5); Gheorghe Iamandi (19 / 5); Costel Orac (23 / 5); Răzvan Dima (2 / 1); Viorel Turcu (11 / 2).
(league appearances and goals listed in brackets)

Manager: Nicolae Dumitru.

Transfers 

Before the season, Dinamo brought defenders Mircea Rednic and Ioan Andone from Corvinul Hunedoara, giving in return Florea Văetuș, Nicușor Vlad, Teofil Stredie and Laurențiu Moldovan. Dudu Georgescu is transferred to SC Bacău.

References

External links 
 www.labtof.ro
 www.romaniansoccer.ro

1983
Romanian football clubs 1983–84 season
1983